A nature center (or nature centre) is an organization with a visitor center or interpretive center designed to educate people about nature and the environment. Usually located within a protected open space, nature centers often have trails through their property.   Some are located within a state or city park, and some have special gardens or an arboretum. Their properties can be characterized as nature preserves and wildlife sanctuaries.  Nature centers generally display small live animals, such as reptiles, rodents, insects, or fish.  There are often museum exhibits and displays about natural history, or preserved mounted animals or nature dioramas.   Nature centers are staffed by paid or volunteer naturalists and most offer educational programs to the general public, as well as summer camp, after-school and school group programs. These educational programs teach people about nature conservation as well as the scientific method, biology, and ecology.

Some nature centers allow free admission but collect voluntary donations in order to help offset expenses.  They usually rely on support from dedicated volunteers.

Environmental education centers differ from nature centers in that their museum exhibits and education programs are available mostly by appointment, although casual visitors may be allowed to walk on their grounds.

Some city, state and national parks have facilities similar to nature centers, such as museum exhibits, dioramas and trails, and some offer park nature education programs, usually presented by a park ranger.

See also
 List of nature centers
 National park

References

Natural history
Environmental education
 
Visitor centers